Réka Forika (born 29 March 1989 in Gheorgheni as Réka Ferencz) is a Romanian biathlete of Hungarian ethnicity.

Career
Ferencz's biggest result so far is the IBU Junior World Championships title, which she achieved at the Biathlon Junior World Championships 2010 in the 12.5 km individual event. By winning the competition she also qualified for the 2010 Winter Olympics, where she ranked 74th in the 15 km distance race and was member of the Romanian 4×6 km relay team that finished tenth out of the 19 competing nations.

References

External links
 Réka Ferencz Profile at the International Biathlon Union

1989 births
Living people
People from Gheorgheni
Székely people
Romanian sportspeople of Hungarian descent
Romanian female biathletes
Olympic biathletes of Romania
Biathletes at the 2010 Winter Olympics